Silva Oliveira is a Portuguese surname, it may be inherited from both father and mother:

Silva Oliveira
Giovanni Silva de Oliveira (born 1972) Brazilian footballer
Kiko — Josualdo Alves da Silva Oliveira (born 1978) Brazilian footballer
Luiz Alberto da Silva Oliveira (born 1977) Brazilian footballer
Toni — António Conceição da Silva Oliveira, (born 1961) Portuguese football coach
Adniellyson da Silva Oliveira, (born 1995), Brazilian footballer
Fábio Miguel Silva Oliveira, (born 1993), Portuguese footballer 
Genalvo da Silva Oliveira,(born 1982), Brazilian footballer

Oliveira Silva
David França Oliveira e Silva (born 1982) Brazilian footballer
Hugo Veloso Oliveira Silva (born 1984) Brazilian footballer
Júnior — Manoel de Oliveira da Silva Júnior (born 1976) Brazilian footballer
Serginho— Paulo Sérgio Oliveira da Silva (1974-2004) Brazilian footballer

.